Tiztoutine (Tarifit: Tizḍudin, ⵜⵉⵣⴹⵓⴷⵉⵏ; Arabic: تزطوطين) is a town in Nador Province, Oriental, Morocco. According to the 2004 census, it has a population of 10,040.

References

Populated places in Nador Province
Rural communes of Oriental (Morocco)